First Transit is an American transportation company.

Headquartered in Cincinnati, Ohio, First Transit operates over 300 locations, carrying more than 350 million passengers annually throughout the United States in 39 states, Puerto Rico, Panama, India and four Canadian provinces.

History

American Transportation Enterprises was founded in 1955. Ryder acquired ATE in 1986. First Transit was formed in 1999 when FirstGroup acquired Ryder Public Transportation Services. In 2007, First Transit acquired Cognisa, a company specializing in shuttle services. Also in 2007, FirstGroup acquired Laidlaw, and merged Laidlaw's transit operations with First Transit.

In April 2016, First Transit commenced operating a five-year contract for Hinjewadi Techzone IT Park in India. In October 2016, First Transit commenced its first rail contract operating the A-train for the Denton County Transportation Authority for a period of nine years.

In December 2016, First Transit began operating the first SAV passenger shuttle route in North America, using the EasyMile EZ10 to loop through Bishop Ranch Office Park in San Ramon, California. Since then, First Transit has gone on to operate many SAV initiatives including a Minnesota SAV Roadshow with stops at Minnesota State Capitol and 3M Global Headquarters and Milo in Arlington, Texas. Milo was the first SAV operation open to the public and shuttled passengers to Globe Life Park and AT&T Stadium.

In 2017, First Transit signed an agreement as the exclusive transit operator partner at GoMentum Station. GoMentum Station is the largest of 10 federally funded secure testing facilities for autonomous and connected vehicle technology in the U.S.

In April 2021, FirstGroup agreed terms were to sell the business to EQT Partners. The sale completed later in 2021.

On the 26th of October 2022, the French mobility company Transdev announced the purchase of First Transit.On March 7, 2023, Transdev completed the acquisition of First Transit, all current First Transit contracts are now operating under the Transdev brand.

Operations
First Transit has more than 19,000 employees and operates and maintains more than 49,000 vehicles and pieces of equipment.

References

External links

Bus companies of India
Bus companies of the United States
Companies based in Cincinnati
FirstGroup companies
Transport companies established in 1955
Transportation companies based in Ohio
1955 establishments in Ohio
2021 mergers and acquisitions
2023 mergers and acquisitions